School of Media Studies may refer to:

East African School of Media Studies, Nairobi, Kenya
School of Media Studies (The New School), part of The Schools of Public Engagement at The New School
School of Media and Cultural Studies (SMCS), part of the Tata Institute of Social Sciences in India